Santha is a 1961 Indian Telugu-language drama film, produced by M. R. Jayaram under the Santhikala Films banner and directed by Manapuram Appa Rao. It stars N. T. Rama Rao and Anjali Devi, with music composed by Ramesh Naidu.

Plot 
Shanta is an innocent village girl. Rangayya is a rich landlord. His eyes are on Shanta and he tries to molest her, in the process of protecting her, her father dies. While escaping from Rangayya, Shanta falls into the hands of a gangster, Dayanidhi but somehow she escapes from him also. On the way, she gets acquainted with a lawyer Srinivas, who gives her shelter in his house. Srinivas is a widower, his son Kumar thinks of Shanta as his mother. Shanta takes care of Kumar with love and affection. Srinivas also starts liking Shanta and marries her, they two are blessed with a son. On the occasion of the child's naming ceremony, Dayanidhi arrives, frightening Shanta, then she learns that he is Srinivas's friend so, she keeps calm. Dayanidhi bribes the maid Rajyam to poison Srinivas, but unfortunately, Kumar dies and the blame falls on Shanta. Fierce Srinivas throws Shanta out of the house. Dayanidhi again tries to catch Shanta, but she escapes and tries to commit suicide. At that time, she hears a cry of a small girl and baby's mother, Shyamala, who is deceived by Dayanidhi and is about to die. Before dying, Shymala hands over baby's responsibility to Shanta and she starts raising the baby by the name Saroja. One day, Srinivas sees Santha with the baby and suspects her chastity. Years later, Srinivas's son Venu and Syamala's daughter Saroja study in the same college and love each other. Srinivas agrees to their marriage, but after seeing that Saroja is Shanta's daughter, he refuses. Shanta falls at Srinivas's feet and begs him by saying that Saroja is not her daughter. But he is not ready to listen. Saroja hears everything and asks Shanta regarding her parents. Shanta reveals the entire truth. The rest of the story is how the truth comes forward and the family is reunited.

Cast 
N. T. Rama Rao as Srinivas
Anjali Devi as Shanta
Kanta Rao
Relangi
Gummadi
Chalam as Venu
K. V. S. Sarma
Balakrishna
Krishna Kumari
Suryakantham
Chaya Devi
Girija as Saroja
Surabhi Balasaraswathi

Soundtrack 

Music composed by Ramesh Naidu.

References

External links 
 

1961 drama films
1961 films
Films scored by Ramesh Naidu
Indian drama films